The Capitol of Puerto Rico is located on the Islet of San Juan just outside the walls of Old San Juan. The building is home to the bicameral Legislative Assembly, composed of the House of Representatives and Senate. The building is located in the Puerta de Tierra sector of San Juan.

The Capitol is also commonly referred to as the Palace of the Laws.

History

Prior to the establishment of the Capitol, the Legislative Assembly used the Provincial Delegation Building, which now houses the Department of State. The idea of constructing a capitol was first introduced by former Resident Commissioner Luis Muñoz Rivera in 1907, and was partly meant to demonstrate some degree of civilian rule in the island, which at the time was already a colony of the United States. The project proposed by Muñoz Rivera assigned $3 million for the construction and established rules for a contest among architectures to decide which one would do the work.

In September 1907, Commissioner of the Interior Laurence Grahame sent the official request for architects through the press and magazines of United States. The specifications for the building were that it was supposed to have three principal installations: the Executive Council, the House of Delegates, and the Supreme Court. It was supposed to be simple, conservative, and appropriate to the island's weather conditions. 134 architectural designs were submitted from the US, Cuba, Canada, France, Spain, and Puerto Rico.

The evaluation of the proposals was in charge of William F. Willoughby (president of the Executive Council), José de Diego (Speaker of the House, represented by Luis Muñoz Rivera), José S. Quiñones (President of the Supreme Court), and Laurence Grahame. Three American architects were also asked to join the commission: E.B. Homerde, John E. Howe, and Bowen Bancroft Smith. In the end, three projects were selected, belonging to Frank E. Perkins (New York City), James H. Ritchie and Lewis B. Abbot (Boston), and Henry L. Beadle (New York).

Finally, the project chosen was the one from Frank E. Perkins, which presented a neoclassical style with little ornamentation. The main halls were organized around a central patio, with the south facade leading to the lobby. The lobby had the dome above, which bore a style similar to the Pantheon in Rome, including the oculus. To the right, there would be a session hall for the Executive Council, and to the left one for the House of Delegates. The Supreme Court would meet in a hall facing north.

However, Luis Muñoz Rivera and the local press preferred another project that was disqualified by the evaluating committee, because the architect had included a slogan in the blueprints, which was forbidden. The project belonged to a Puerto Rican engineer called Carlos del Valle Zeno. Del Valle's project presented a Renaissance style, with neoclassic orders.

Despite public opinion, Perkins was hired to make the construction blueprints for the Capitol, which were then auctioned. It wasn't until 1920 that the project was retaken when the Commissioner of the Interior, Guillermo Esteves, published a new design. The change came after a revision from the Department of Interior, which found Perkins' design to be inappropriate. With the supervision of architects Adrian C. Finlayson, Francisco Roldán, and Pedro de Castro, new blueprints were made using the Renaissance style.

Construction of the building eventually began in 1921 under the leadership of Antonio R. Barceló. However, construction was halted after completion of the first level. When Finlayson got ill, he was replaced by Rafael Carmoega who, along with architects Joseph O'Kelly, William Schimmelpfennig, Harry Pembleton, Albert Nichols, Luis F. Pina, and Gonzalo Fernós Maldonado, made another design to finish the structure.

Their design incorporated some of the elements from Perkins's original design, including the dome. The model for the central structure and the dome was that of the Low Memorial Library at Columbia University.

The building was inaugurated on February 11, 1929, with the first meeting of the Legislative Assembly taking place three days later.

It was listed on the U.S. National Register of Historic Places in 1977 as El Capitolio de Puerto Rico.

Capitol Building complex

Designed in the 1950s by the Toro-Ferrer architectural firm, the Rafael Martínez Nadal building serves as the Senate Annex on the Senate side with offices for senators and two hearing rooms, and the Ernesto Ramos Antonini building serves as the House Annex on the House side with offices for representatives as well as hearing rooms. The Luis Muñoz Marín Office Building houses the Office of Legislative Services, the Luis A. Ferré Building houses offices for both chambers, as well as a 700 space parking garage, while the Antonio R. Barceló Building, former School of Tropical Medicine building houses offices for both chambers, the Legislative Library, and offices for the Superintendent of the Capitol and the Resident Commissioner of Puerto Rico. The Ramón Mellado Parsons Building houses Senate offices. The buildings that formerly housed the State Commission of Elections in Puerta de Tierra are currently used to house House archives, as well as administrative offices.

Architectural drawings
The Architecture and Construction Archives at the University of Puerto Rico (AACUPR) is the custodian of the Capitol of Puerto Rico Collection (1924-1926). Approximately eight cubic feet in size, the collection contains architectural drawings, photographs and textual documents. The original drawings, executed in ink over drawing cloth, were produced by the Department of the Interior under the supervision of Puerto Rican architect Rafael Carmoega. The 28 originals and 38 blue prints show plans, elevations, sections as well as electrical and plumbing distribution. There is also a proposal for the surrounding gardens by the architectural firm of Bennet, Parsons and Frost and several plates showing entries for the building competition. The collection was transferred to the AACUPR by the Capitol Superintendency in 1986.

Gallery

See also

 List of state and territorial capitols in the United States

References

External links

 

Old San Juan, Puerto Rico
Legislative Assembly of Puerto Rico
Puerto Rico
Government buildings completed in 1929
National Register of Historic Places in San Juan, Puerto Rico
Government buildings on the National Register of Historic Places in Puerto Rico
Puerto Rico
Neoclassical architecture in Puerto Rico
Beaux-Arts architecture in Puerto Rico
1929 establishments in Puerto Rico